The , nicknamed the , represents Japan in men's international football. It is controlled by the Japan Football Association (JFA), the governing body for football in Japan.

Japan was not a major football force until the end of the 1980s, with a small and amateur team. For a long time in Japan, football was a less popular sport than baseball and sumo. Since the 1990s, when Japanese football became fully professionalized, Japan has emerged as one of the most successful teams in Asia; they have qualified for the last seven FIFA World Cups (qualifying for the 2002 event as co-hosts with South Korea) with knockout stage appearances in 2002, 2010, 2018 and 2022, and won the AFC Asian Cup a record four times, in 1992, 2000, 2004 and 2011. The team also finished second in the 2001 FIFA Confederations Cup and the 2019 AFC Asian Cup. Japan remains the only team from the AFC other than Australia and Saudi Arabia to have reached the final of a senior FIFA men's competition.

Japan's progression in a short period has served as an inspiration and example of how to develop football. Their principal continental rivals are South Korea and, most recently, Australia; they also developed rivalries against Iran and Saudi Arabia.

Japan was the first team from outside the Americas to participate in the Copa América, having been invited in 1999, 2011, 2015, and 2019 editions of the tournament, though they only played in the 1999 and 2019 events.

History

Pre-war era (1910s–1930s)

Japan's earliest international matches were at the 1917 Far Eastern Championship Games in Tokyo, where it was represented by a team from the Tokyo Higher Normal School. Although Japan made strong showings in swimming, baseball, and track and field, its football team suffered resounding defeats to the Republic of China and the Philippines. Nevertheless, the game was promoted in Japanese schools in the 1920s. The Japan Football Association was formed in 1921, and Japan joined FIFA in May 1929.

Japan's first "true" national team (as opposed to a university team chosen to represent the country) was fielded at the 1930 Far Eastern Championship Games, and drew with China for the championship title. Shigeyoshi Suzuki coached the national team to its first Olympic appearance at the 1936 Summer Olympics in Berlin. Japan was an entrant for the 1938 FIFA World Cup qualification, but withdrew before its scheduled qualifying match against the Dutch East Indies.

After World War II began in earnest, Japan did not play in international competition, except for a handful of matches against Manchuria and other colonies. Its last prewar match for purposes of Elo ratings was a friendly against the Philippines in June 1940.

While Korea was under Japanese rule, multiple Koreans played in international competition for Japan, including Kim Yong-sik (1936–40), Kim Sung-gan (1940) and Lee Yoo-hyung (1940).

Post-war Era (1950s–1980s)

Japan's postwar debut was in the 1951 Asian Games in India. Japan re-joined FIFA in 1950 and played in qualifiers for the 1954 FIFA World Cup, but lost the AFC qualifying berth to South Korea after two matches, beginning an intense rivalry. Japan also joined the Asian Football Confederation in 1954.

Dettmar Cramer joined the Japan national team as coach in 1960, and helped lead the team to the round of eight at the 1964 Summer Olympics in Tokyo. Japan's first major achievement in international football came in the 1968 Summer Olympics in Mexico City, where the team won the bronze medal. Although this result earned the sport increased recognition in Japan, the absence of a professional domestic league hindered its growth and Japan would not qualify for the FIFA World Cup until 30 years later. Nonetheless, Japan had come close to qualify for the 1986 FIFA World Cup, but lost to South Korea in the deciding matches.

Japan made its first appearance in the Asian Cup in 1988, where they were eliminated in the group stage following a draw with Iran and losses to South Korea, the United Arab Emirates and Qatar.

The late 1980s saw concrete moves to professionalize the sport in Japan. JFA introduced a Special Licensed Player system in 1986, allowing a limited number of professional players to compete in the domestic semi-professional league. Action committees were held in 1988 and 1989 to discuss the introduction of a full professional league in Japan.

1990s: Rise

In 1991, the owners of the semi-professional Japan Soccer League agreed to disband the league and re-form as the professional J.League, partly to raise the sport's profile and to strengthen the national team program. The following year, Japan hosted the 1992 Asian Cup and won their first title by defeating Saudi Arabia 1–0 in the final. The J.League was officially launched in 1993.

However, in its first attempt to qualify with professional players, Japan narrowly missed a ticket to the 1994 World Cup after drawing with Iraq in the final match of the qualification round, remembered by fans as the "Agony of Doha". Japan's next tournament was a defence of their continental title at the 1996 Asian Cup. The team won all their games in the group stage but were eliminated in the quarter-finals after a 2–0 loss to Kuwait.

The nation's first ever World Cup appearance was in 1998, where Japan lost all their games. The first two fixtures went 1–0 in favour of Argentina and Croatia, and the campaign ended with a 2–1 defeat to Jamaica. Japan impressed in all three games, however, with all three defeats were just one goal margin.

2000s
In the 2000 AFC Asian Cup, Japan managed to reclaim their title after defeating Saudi Arabia in the final, becoming Asian champions for the second time.

Two years later, Japan co-hosted the 2002 World Cup with South Korea. After a 2–2 draw with Belgium in their opening match, the Japanese team advanced to the second round with a 1–0 win over Russia and a 2–0 victory against Tunisia. However, they subsequently exited the tournament during the round of 16, after losing 1–0 to eventual third-place finishers Turkey.

With the 2004 AFC Asian Cup hosted by China, the Japanese managed to retain the title by winning their group after two victories over Thailand and Oman, before surpassing Jordan and Bahrain. They won against China in the final 3–1.

On 8 June 2005, Japan qualified for the 2006 World Cup in Germany, its third consecutive World Cup, by beating North Korea 2–0 on neutral ground. However, Japan failed to advance to the round of 16, losing to Australia 1–3, drawing Croatia 0–0 and losing to Brazil 1–4.

The 2007 AFC Asian Cup saw Japan failed to defend the title. Although easily winning the group Vietnam and two Arab rivals, Qatar and the UAE, the Japanese were totally exhausted in their game against Australia, where Japan won only by a penalty shootout. Japan lost to Saudi Arabia in the semi-finals before failing in the third-place match against South Korea.

2010s
During the 2010 World Cup qualification, in the fourth round of the Asian Qualifiers, Japan became the first team other than the host South Africa to qualify after defeating Uzbekistan 1–0 away. Japan was drawn in Group E along with the Netherlands, Denmark and Cameroon. Japan started with a 1–0 win against Cameroon, before subsequently losing to the Netherlands 0–1. Then, Japan resoundingly beat Denmark 3–1 to advance to the next round against Paraguay. In the round of 16, Japan were eliminated from the competition following penalties after a 0–0 draw against Paraguay.

After the World Cup, head coach Takeshi Okada resigned. He was replaced by former Juventus and Milan coach Alberto Zaccheroni. In his first few matches, Japan recorded victories over Guatemala (2–1) and Paraguay (1–0), as well as a 1–0 victory over Argentina.

In 2011, Japan participated in the 2011 AFC Asian Cup in Qatar. On 29 January, they beat Australia 1–0 in the final after extra time, their fourth Asian Cup triumph and allowing them to qualify for the 2013 FIFA Confederations Cup.

Japan then started their road to 2014 World Cup in Brazil. Throughout, they suffered only two losses to Uzbekistan and Jordan, and drawing against Australia. Afterwards, on 12 October, Japan earned a historic 1–0 victory over France. After a 1–1 draw with Australia they qualified for the 2014 World Cup, becoming the first nation aside from Brazil to qualify.

Japan started their 2013 Confederations Cup campaign with a 3–0 loss to Brazil. They were then eliminated from the competition after losing to Italy 3–4. They lost their final match 1–2 against Mexico and finished in fourth place in Group A. One month later, in the EAFF East Asian Cup, they started out with a 3–3 draw to China. They then beat Australia 3–2 and beat South Korea 2–1 in the third and final match in the 2013 EAFF East Asian Cup to claim the title.

Japan was placed into Group C at the 2014 World Cup alongside the Ivory Coast, Greece and Colombia. They fell in their first match to Ivory Coast 2–1 after initially taking the lead, allowing two goals in a two-minute span. They drew their second game to Greece 0–0. To qualify for the second round, they needed a victory against Colombia and Greece to win against Ivory Coast. Greece beat Ivory Coast 2–1, but Colombia won 4–1, eliminating Japan from the World Cup. Alberto Zaccheroni resigned as head coach. In July 2014, former Mexico and Espanyol manager Javier Aguirre took over and Japan lost 0–2 to Uruguay in the first game he managed.

Japan won its opening match at the 2015 AFC Asian Cup in Group D against Asian Cup debutantes Palestine 4–0, with goals from Yasuhito Endō, Shinji Okazaki, Keisuke Honda via a penalty and Maya Yoshida. Okazaki was named man of the match. They then faced Iraq and Jordan in their next group matches, which they won 1–0 and 2–0 respectively. They qualified to knockout stage as Group D winner with nine points, seven goals scored and no goals conceded. In the quarter-finals, Japan lost to the United Arab Emirates in a penalty shootout after a 1–1 draw, as Honda and Shinji Kagawa missed their penalty kicks. Japan's elimination marked their worst performance in the tournament in 19 years.

After the Asian Cup, Aguirre was sacked following allegations of corruption during a prior tenure. He was replaced by Vahid Halilhodžić in March 2015. Japan started on a rough note during qualification, losing to the UAE 1–2 at home. They then picked up the pace in their other qualifier games against Iraq, Australia, and Thailand, picking up 5 wins and 2 draws. Then, on 31 August 2017, Japan defeated Australia 2–0 at home thus qualifying them for the 2018 FIFA World Cup in Russia, making it their sixth successive World Cup. However, the Japan Football Association decided to sack Halilhodžić on 9 April 2018, only ten weeks before the World Cup finals, citing reasons of a breakdown in relationship between coach and player, and poor recent friendly results, and appoint the Technical Director, Japanese coach Akira Nishino, who had managed the Japanese Under-23 team at the 1996 Olympics, as the new manager.

Japan made history in the 2018 FIFA World Cup by defeating Colombia 2–1, their first ever victory by any AFC team against a CONMEBOL team in an official tournament, as well as Japan's first ever victory at the FIFA World Cup finals in UEFA nations. Their second match ended in a draw against Senegal, with one goal scored by Takashi Inui and the other by Keisuke Honda. Japan were defeated in their last group game in the Group H against Poland 0–1, leaving Japan and Senegal tied for second with an identical record, however, as Japan had received two fewer yellow cards, Japan advanced to the knockout stage on the Fair Play Points tiebreaker, the first team to do so. The match with Poland caused controversy; as Japan were made aware of their advantage over Senegal with ten minutes left and decided to play an extremely conservative game, passing the ball around to one another and keeping it in their own box, seeking to avoid any bookings and didn't attempt to take any serious shots on goal, despite losing 0–1, with some fans booing the players. The match received comparison to the 1982 World Cup Disgrace of Gijón, in which a similar game was played. Japan were the only AFC team to have qualified to the knockout stage. In the Round of 16 against Belgium, Japan took a surprising 2–0 lead with a goal in the 48th minute by Genki Haraguchi and another in the 52nd by Takashi Inui, but yielded 3 goals afterwards, including the winner by Nacer Chadli on the counterattack in the 94th minute. This was Japan's third time having reached the last 16, equaling their best result at a World Cup. Japan's defeat to eventual third-place finishers Belgium was the first time a nation had lost a knockout match at the World Cup after taking a two-goal advantage since England lost to West Germany 2–3 in extra-time in the quarter-final of the 1970 edition. This unfortunate scenario was due to the naivety of the Nipponese, who were very offensive and did not fall back enough in defense once the two-goal lead was acquired (unlike France, eventual champion, in the semifinals who played low block against these same Belgians with success), leaving a lot of space to the Belgians, who also took advantage of their physical and athletic superiority to turn the game around. However, Japan's impressive performance was praised by fans, pundits and medias for their fighting spirits, as demonstrated by Japan's win over Colombia, a draw to Senegal and a strong counter offensive against heavyweight Belgium.

Japan participated in the 2019 AFC Asian Cup and had an almost successful tournament. The team easily topped group F after defeating Turkmenistan 3–2, Oman 1–0 and Uzbekistan 2–1. The team, however, got criticized for its defensive approach (as the offensive approach lead to a regretful scenario against Belgium during the World Cup 2018), as Japan won the group with only one goal margin wins in all three matches and two later knockout stage's matches as Japan only beat fellow powerhouse Saudi Arabia in the round of sixteen and dark horse Vietnam in the quarter-finals both with 1–0 margin. After defeating Iran 3–0 to reach the final, Japan's hope to win their fifth Asian Cup in two decades shattered with the team suffering a 1–3 loss to Qatar, who won the Asian Cup for the first time.

Japan were invited to the 2019 Copa America, their second appearance at the tournament, and brought a young squad to the competition. They were in Group C with Uruguay, Chile and Ecuador. They lost their opening match, 0–4 to Chile. Japan, however, bounced back well and managed to unluckily draw against football giants Uruguay 2–2, who (Uruguay) were deemed to have been saved by VAR. Japan needed a win against Ecuador to qualify for the knockouts, however they drew 1–1 and missed out due to inferior goal differences to Paraguay. Aftermath saw Japan played a friendly game against the Paraguayans, and won 2–0 at home.

2020s
After China was removed as host of the 2022 EAFF E-1 Football Championship, it was announced that Japan was the new host. After topping the table with two wins and one draw, Japan won the competition for the second time in their history.

Japan qualified for the 2022 FIFA World Cup, and were grouped with Germany, Costa Rica and Spain in Group E. On 23 November 2022, Japan produced an upset in which they beat Germany 2–1, with two goals in an eight-minute span during the second half.  After losing to Costa Rica 1–0, going into the final matchday, every team in Japan's group can qualify or be eliminated, with no team assured of any placement. In the end, Japan managed to qualify for the knockout stages by defeating Spain 2–1 in their final group match, also contributing to Germany's elimination from the tournament. By topping their group, Japan went on to face Croatia in the round of 16 where Japan would lose 1–3 on penalties after a 1–1 draw. It is the third team in 52 years to have come from behind twice in one tournament, following Brazil and (West) Germany. They beat Spain with the lowest possession of the ball ever for a team since the 1966 World Cup. It is the first time that an Asian team topped their World Cup group held outside their home country, and also the first Asian team to reach the knockouts twice in a row.

Team image

Nicknames
The team also is often known by the last name of the manager.

Kits

The national team kit design has gone through several alterations in the past. In the early 1980s, the kit was white with blue trim. The kits worn for the 1992 Asian Cup consisted of white stripes (stylized to form a wing) with red diamonds. During the 1996 Asian Cup and in the 1998 World Cup, the national team kits were blue jerseys with red and white flame designs on the sleeves, and were designed by JFA (with the sponsor alternating each year between Asics, Puma, and Adidas). The 1996 design was reproduced in a special kit used against Syria on 7 June 2017.

Japan uses blue and white rather than red and white due to a superstition. Japan first used blue shirts in the 1930 Far Eastern Championship Games, where a team of the Tokyo Imperial University (whose color is light blue) represented Japan wearing light blue shirts, and then in a 3–2 victory over Sweden in the first game of its maiden major international competition, the 1936 Summer Olympics. When Japan was coached by Kenzo Yokoyama (1988–1992) the kits were red and white, matching the colours of Japan's national flag. After failures at 1990 FIFA World Cup and 1992 Summer Olympics qualifications, the red shirt was scrapped.

In the 2013 Confederations Cup and the 2015 AFC Asian Cup, Japan temporarily switched the colour of the numbers from white to gold.

Japan's kit is provided by German company Adidas, the team's exclusive kit supplier since April 1999. Before that, Asics and Puma had been the team's official apparel sponsor alongside Adidas.

On 3 June 2021, Japan released the special 100th anniversary kit for a friendly match against Jamaica, but the match was cancelled and replaced with a match against the U-24 team. The kit was also used by the U-24 team against U-24 Ghana on 5 June 2021.

Kit suppliers

Crest

The crest or emblem of the national team was adopted in late 2017 as part of a larger rebranding by the Japan Football Association. The crest features the Yatagarasu, a three-legged crow from Japanese mythology that is a symbol for the sun, holding a solid red ball that is like the sun from national flag. The text "JFA" (for the Japan Football Association) is inscribed at the bottom of the crow. A red stripe is also present at the center of the shield behind the crow. The shield has a metallic gold trim and has a thicker black outline. The name of the country represented by the national team "Japan" is also inscribed within the black border.

The previous crest used from 1996 had a shield with a more complex shape. The ball held by the Yatagarasu had white details. The text "Japan" is absent and "JFA" is written in a different typeface.

Before 1988, Japan used the national flag outlined in red (and with JFA written in black on the lower left corner of the flag) on the shirts.

The Yatagarasu was first seen on the Japan shirts in 1988, where it was on a yellow circle with a blue outline with "JAPAN FOOTBALL ASSOCIATION" written around it. In 1991, the emblem changed to a white shield with a red vertical stripe on the center with the crow on it and "JFA" written in a green Gothic typeface. This crest was used until 1996.

Home stadium

Japan plays its home matches among various stadiums, in rotation, around the country, especially the Saitama Stadium 2002.

Rivalries

South Korea

Japan maintains a strong football rivalry with South Korea. The football rivalry is long-seated and is often seen as an extension of an overall historic rivalry between the two nations. Japan have met South Korea 80 times, trailing the statistic at 15 wins, 23 draws, and 42 losses. Japan have scored 73 goals and conceded 153. Since November 1991, when the Japan Professional Football League was launched, the record is almost even with 9 wins, 12 draws and 10 losses. Both countries have made themselves unrivalled in both Asian Cup and World Cup records, being the two most successful Asian countries, and they hosted the 2002 FIFA World Cup in a joint bid.

China 

Japan and China used to have a strong rivalry and the rivalry was taken to a new height when Japan beat China 3–1 in the 2004 AFC Asian Cup Final. Previously, when Japan had not established professional football, Japan had only 4 wins, 3 draws and 13 losses toward China. However, Japan's rapid rise since 1991 with the foundation of Japan Professional Football League helped turning the tide, and the Japanese have been able to exert domination with 13 wins, 6 draws and just 2 losses. Moreover, Japan have been able to use the new professional program into senior successes, qualifying to every FIFA World Cup since 1998 and winning four AFC Asian Cup; whereas China have finished runners-up in Asia twice, and qualified to just one FIFA World Cup in 2002.

Australia

Japan began to develop a fierce rivalry with fellow Asian powerhouse Australia, shortly after the latter joined the Asian Football Confederation (AFC). The rivalry is regarded as one of Asia's biggest football rivalries. The rivalry is a relatively recent one, born from a number of highly competitive matches between the two teams since Australia joined the AFC in 2006. The rivalry began at the 2006 World Cup where the two countries were grouped together, and continued with the two countries meeting regularly in various AFC competitions, such as the 2007 AFC Asian Cup, the 2011 AFC Asian Cup Final and the 2013 EAFF East Asian Cup. Likewise, Australia and Japan also share World Cup and continental records that is nearly unrivaled in Asia, and also similar that football is not the main sport in both nations until recently; yet hold an indistinguishable record that being the only three members from the AFC to have reached the final of any senior FIFA competition, the other being Saudi Arabia, both in the defunct FIFA Confederations Cup, albeit Australia achieved it when the country still belonged to the OFC. Japan have met Australia 27 times, with a record of 11 wins, 9 draws and 7 losses. Since the launch of the Japan Professional Football League in November 1991, the record has been 10 wins, 7 draws and 4 losses.

Supporters

Japanese national team supporters are known for chanting "Nippon Ole" (Nippon is the Japanese word for Japan) at home matches.

Sponsorship
Japan has one of the highest sponsorship incomes for a national squad. In 2006 their sponsorship income amounted to over 16.5 million pounds.

Primary sponsors include Adidas, Kirin, Saison Card International, FamilyMart, JAL, MS&AD Insurance Group, Asahi Shinbun, Mizuho Financial, Daito Trust Construction and KDDI.

Mascot
The mascots are "Karappe" and "Karara", two Yatagarasu wearing the Japan national football team kit. The mascots were designed by Japanese manga artist Susumu Matsushita. Each year when a new kit is launched, the mascots' uniforms are updated in order to match the kit being used by the team.

For the 2014 FIFA World Cup, the Pokémon character Pikachu served as the mascot.

Results and fixtures

The following is a list of match results in the last 12 months, as well as any future matches that have been scheduled.

Legend

2022

 Fixtures & Results (2022), JFA.jp

2023

Players

Current squad
The following players were called up for the Kirin Challenge Cup, where the team will play against Uruguay and Colombia on 24 and 28 March 2023, respectively.

Caps and goals as of 5 December 2022, after the match against .

Recent call-ups
The following players have been called up to the squad in the last 12 months.

INJ Withdrew due to injury
PRE Preliminary squad / standby
RET Retired from the national team
SUS Serving suspension
WD Player withdrew from the squad due to non-injury issue.

Players & Staffs, JFA.jp

Records

Players in bold are still active with Japan.

Most appearances

Top goalscorers

Captains

Competitive record
 Champions   Runners-up   Third place   Fourth place  

*Denotes draws includes knockout matches decided on penalty shootouts. Red border indicates that the tournament was hosted on home soil. Gold, silver, bronze backgrounds indicate 1st, 2nd and 3rd finishes respectively. Bold text indicates best finish in tournament.

FIFA World Cup

Match history

AFC Asian Cup

Match history

Copa América

Japan is the first team from outside the Americas to participate in the Copa América, having been invited to the 1999 Copa América. Japan was also invited to the 2011 tournament and initially accepted the invitation. However, following the 2011 Tōhoku earthquake and tsunami, the JFA later withdrew on 16 May 2011, citing the difficulty of releasing some Japanese players from European teams to play as replacements. On the next day, CONMEBOL invited Costa Rica to replace Japan in the competition.

On 16 August 2013, CONMEBOL president Eugenio Figueredo announced that Japan was invited to the 2015 Copa América. However, Japan later declined the invitation due to scheduling problems.

On 14 May 2018, CONMEBOL announced that Japan, alongside Qatar, would be the two invited teams for the 2019 Copa América.

Match history

FIFA Confederations Cup

Match history

Olympic Games

Match history

Asian Games

Match history

EAFF E-1 Championship

Match history

Head-to-head record

The following table shows Japan's all-time international record, correct as of 1 December 2022.

FIFA World Ranking
, after the match against .

 Best Ranking   Best Mover   Worst Ranking   Worst Mover

Honours

Intercontinental
Olympic Games
 Bronze medalists: 1968
FIFA Confederations Cup
 Runners-up: 2001

Continental
AFC Asian Cup
 Champions: 1992, 2000, 2004, 2011
 Runners-up: 2019
Fourth place: 2007
Asian Games
 Third place: 1951, 1966
Fourth place: 1970

Regional
Far Eastern Games
 Champions: 1930
Dynasty Cup
 Champions: 1992, 1995, 1998
Fourth place: 1990
EAFF E-1 Football Championship
 East Asian Football Championship (2003–2010), EAFF East Asian Cup (2013–2015)
 Champions: 2013, 2022
 Runners-up: 2003, 2005, 2008, 2017, 2019
 Third place: 2010

Others
Afro-Asian Cup of Nations
 Champions: 1993, 2007
AFC – OFC Challenge Cup
 Champions: 2001

Minor-friendly
Kirin Cup
 Champions: (12): 1991, 1995, 1996, 1997, 2000, 2001, 2004, 2007, 2008, 2009, 2011, 2015

Awards
AFC National Team of the Year
Years: 2000, 2005, 2008, 2010, 2011
Japan Professional Sports Grand Prize
Years: 2002

See also
National teams
Men's
Japan national under-23 football team
Japan national under-20 football team
Japan national under-17 football team
Japan national futsal team
Japan national under-20 futsal team
Japan national beach soccer team
Women's
Japan women's national football team
Japan women's national under-23 football team
Japan women's national under-20 football team
Japan women's national under-17 football team

Notes

References

External links

 Official website at JFA.jp 
 Japan profile at FIFA.com (archived 3 June 2007)
 Japan at the World Cups at TheFIFAWorldCups.com
 Japan national football team fixtures and results (2022) at JFA.jp

 
AFC Asian Cup-winning countries
Asian national association football teams